Gudrun Sjödén (born 5 June 1941) is a Swedish fashion designer.

Sjödén grew up in the village of Julita in Södermanland, and studied textile and fashion at  Konstfack from 1958 to 1963. She married photographer Björn Sjödén (1940-2016) in 1961. Along with him she in 1976 opened the first Gudrun Sjödén clothing shop in Stockholm at Regeringsgatan. The company has about one hundred employees and earns a quarter of a billion (SEK) a year.

In 2007, she received the Litteris et Artibus medal from King Carl Gustaf of Sweden.

References

External links 

1941 births
Swedish fashion designers
Living people
Litteris et Artibus recipients